Phyllidiella nigra is a species of sea slug, a dorid nudibranch, a shell-less marine gastropod mollusk in the family Phyllidiidae.

Description
Phyllidiella nigra can reach a length of about 25–75 mm. It shows a black background with rounded pink to purplish tubercles over the dorsum. These tubercles are mainly isolated or in small clumps.

Distribution
This species was described from Java, Indonesia. It is reported to be widespread in the Indo-west Pacific region.

Habitat
This species occurs on shallow coral reefs, at depths of about 1–6 m.

Bibliography 
 Brunckhorst, D.J. (1993) The systematics and phylogeny of Phyllidiid Nudibranchs (Doridoidea). Records of the Australian Museum, Supplement 16: 1-107.

References

External links 
 Nudipixel
 Philippine sea slugs
 

Phyllidiidae
Gastropods described in 1824